T. R. Reid (born Thomas Roy Reid III in 1944) is an American reporter, documentary film correspondent, and author. He has also been a frequent guest on National Public Radio (NPR)'s Morning Edition.   Reid currently lives in Denver, Colorado.

Career 
Reid, a Classics major at Princeton University, served as a naval officer, taught, and held various positions before working for The Washington Post. At the Post, he covered Congress and four Presidential election campaigns, and was chief of the Posts London, Tokyo and Denver-based Rocky Mountain bureau. He has also taught at Princeton and the University of Michigan. His experiences in Japan led him to write Confucius Lives Next Door: What Living in the East Teaches Us About Living in the West, which argued that Confucian values of family devotion, education, and long-term relations, which still permeate East Asian societies, contributed to their social stability. A 2007 Kaiser Family Foundation media fellow in health, he is a member of the board of the Colorado Coalition for the Homeless and the University of Colorado Medical School.

Reid won an Alicia Patterson Journalism Fellowship in 1982 writing about the U.S. semiconductor industry.

In the fall of 1963, Reid and three other Princeton sophomores—Arthur F. Davidsen, Steven D. Reich, and Frederick W. Talcott (plus Columbia University sophomore Charles A. Lieppe and Michigan State University sophomore Steven E. Cook)—perpetrated one of the most famous hoaxes in Princeton's history. Together, they created the fictitious high school student Joseph David Oznot, who applied for, and gained admission to Princeton. This led to Reid's appearance as a challenger on the television show To Tell the Truth on September 14, 1964.

In 2004, Reid published an analysis of the European Community, The United States of Europe: The New Superpower and The End of American Supremacy.  In his book, which was written before the Greek government-debt crisis, Great Britain's exit from the EU, the rejection of the European Constitution by France and Holland, and the re-introduction of temporary border controls during the Covid-19 pandemic by some EU member states, Reid postulated that the European Community was emerging as a united superpower rivaling the political and economic power of the United States.

Frontline documentaries on health care 
His 2008 documentary for the U.S. television series Frontline, Sick Around the World, looked at the comprehensive health care systems of five developed economies from around the world. The first two countries visited were the United Kingdom and Japan, where he had previously lived, worked, and also received medical care. They were followed by Germany, Taiwan, and Switzerland.

Frontline asked Reid to follow up with a companion documentary, Sick Around America, which aired March 31, 2009, on PBS. However, Reid parted company with PBS before the film was finished. Reid argued that the film came off as supporting mandated private-insurance coverage. Reid was quoted as saying "...mandating for-profit insurance is not the lesson from other countries in the world. I said I'm not going to be in a film that contradicts my previous film and my book." PBS responded to these criticisms, stating that "Frontline takes a strongly different view of the characterization of its editorial disagreement with T. R. Reid as presented by Reid and Russell Mokhiber." It argued that Reid had misrepresented the role of a key respondent in the film, the extent of Reid's role in making the film, and the balance PBS had sought to present. Reid used his right of reply to challenge PBS's characterization of their and his own positions.

His investigations into health care resulted in his New York Times bestselling book The Healing of America: A Global Quest for Better, Cheaper and Fairer Health Care. In 2015, Reid became chairman of the Colorado Foundation for Universal Health Care. In that role, he served as a lead spokesman in the campaign for Amendment 69, the unsuccessful November 2016 Colorado ballot initiative to create ColoradoCare, a state-based health plan to cover all Colorado residents. The ColoradoCare initiative Reid championed had hoped to "demonstrate that universal coverage can work. And then Colorado will lead our great nation to a destination we should have achieved long ago: high-quality health care, at reasonable cost, for every American."

Reid also served on the board of Princeton University, the Health Research and Education Trust, and the Japan-America Society of Colorado. He is vice-chairman of the board of the Colorado Coalition for the Homeless. 

T. R. Reid's latest book, A Fine Mess: A Global Quest for a Simpler, Fairer, and More Efficient Tax System, was published on April 15, 2017.

Publications
 
 
 
 
 
  Translation of:

References

External links
 
 Critique of The United States of Europe
 Sick Around the World website
 Interview of T. R. Reid by Terry Gross on Fresh Air
 
 Interview with Reid on Confucius Lives Next Door, Booknotes, May 16, 1999
 Interview with Reid, In Depth, March 7, 2010
 Interview with Reid, C-SPAN Q&A, September 6, 2009
  T. R. Reid addresses The Commonwealth Club of California, San Francisco, CA, Sept. 14, 2009
 Feature-length radio interview on The Global Quest for Healthcare with KGNU's Claudia Cragg
 
 "Author Looks to Other Countries to Rethink America's Complicated Tax Code", interview on Fresh Air (2017-04-03) with T. R. Reid about A Fine Mess: A Global Quest for a Simpler, Fairer, and More Efficient Tax System 

1943 births
American columnists
American documentary filmmakers
American male journalists
American social sciences writers
Living people
NPR personalities
Place of birth missing (living people)
Princeton University alumni
Writers from Denver